The discography of Oomph!, a German rock band, often considered to be the original Neue Deutsche Härte musical group, consists of thirteen studio albums and one video album. Oomph! has also released twenty-three singles. The band was formed in mid-1989 by three musicians from Wolfsburg: singer/drummer Dero Goi, guitarist/programmer Andreas Crap and guitarist/bassist/programmer Robert Flux.

Oomph! debuted with the single "Ich bin Du", released in 1991. The following year, the band released their first studio album, the self-titled Oomph!, their only album to date with Machinery Records.

Studio albums

Compilation albums

DVDs

Singles

Music videos
 1994 – "Sex"
 1995 – "Ice-Coffin"
 1998 – "Gekreuzigt"
 1998 – "Gekreuzigt" remix
 1999 – "Das weiße Licht"
 1999 – "Fieber" (feat. Nina Hagen)
 2001 – "Supernova"
 2001 – "Niemand"
 2004 – "Augen auf!"
 2004 – "Brennende Liebe" (feat. L'Âme Immortelle)
 2004 – "Sex hat keine Macht"
 2006 – "Gott ist ein Popstar"
 2006 – "Das letzte Streichholz"
 2006 – "Die Schlinge" (feat. Apocalyptica)
 2006 – "Gekreuzigt 2006"
 2006 – "The Power of Love"
 2007 – "Träumst du?" (feat. Marta Jandová)
 2008 – "Wach auf!"
 2008 – "Beim ersten Mal tut's immer weh"
 2008 – "Labyrinth"
 2008 – "Auf Kurs"
 2009 – "Sandmann"
 2012 – "Ernten was wir Säen"
 2012 – "Zwei Schritte vor"
 2015 – "Alles aus Liebe"
 2018 – "Tausend Mann und ein Befehl"
 2019 - "In Namen des Vaters"

Remixes
"Upperworld" – Syntec
"Ich sehe dich" – Such A Surge
"L 'Oasis" – La Floa Maldita
"Good God (The Man)" – Korn
"Und ... ich lauf" – Joachim Witt
"Painful Reconstructed" EP – Sin
"Freedom" – De/Vision
"Sheila" – Rauhfaser
"Here Comes the Pain" – Farmer Boys
"Silver Surger" – Such a Surge
"Keilerkopf I" – Keilerkopf
"Hülle" – Keilerkopf
"Traumschloss" – Keilerkopf
"Monochrom" – Herzer
"Glas" – Herzer
"Supergestört und Superversaut" – Joachim Witt
"Krieger" – And One
"Ernten was wir säen" – Die Fantastischen Vier

References

Discographies of German artists
Rock music discographies
Electronic music discographies